Académie de la Moraine is a French first language elementary school located in Richmond Hill, Ontario, Canada. It serves the French population of the GTA. If the French language is not the student's first language, an admission test can be taken, to allow the enrollment. The school also offers busing for students that requires said service. Its former location was 13200 Yonge Street in Richmond Hill. However, after George Street P.S. closed, Moraine took up its space.  George St P.S students went to Aurora Senior/Wellington P.S. Nonetheless, in 2019, after remodelling, reconstruction, and upgrading the school facilities, the school has returned to its previous address — 13200 Yonge Street.

In the past, the school have had some split classes, such as a class with both grade 5 and 6 at the same time.

Segway to High School  
Those who attend and graduate Académie de la Moraine usually attend École Secondaire Norval-Morrisseau, a French high school of the same school board from grades 7–12. Mid 2017, Norval-Morrisseau was one among three schools of the same board chosen to implement an Advanced Placement Program (AP).

See also 
Conseil scolaire Viamonde
Conseil scolaire de district du Centre-Sud-Ouest

External links 
 

Moraine
Moraine
Educational institutions established in 2000
Education in Richmond Hill, Ontario
2000 establishments in Ontario